Arauco Province is one of three provinces of the Chilean region of Bío Bío. It spans a coastal area of  just south of the mouth of the Biobío River, the traditional demarcation between the nation's major natural regions, Zona Central and Zona Sur. The province originally covered the once-independent indigenous territory of Araucanía, but this was afterward divided into four provinces. It is devoted largely to agricultural pursuits.

Administration
As a province, Arauco is a second-level administrative division of Chile, governed by a provincial governor who is appointed by the president.

Communes
The province is composed of seven communes, each governed by a municipality consisting of an elected alcalde and municipal council.

 Arauco
 Cañete
 Contulmo
 Curanilahue
 Lebu (provincial capital)
 Los Álamos
 Tirúa

Geography and demography
Of these, 117,569 (74.8%) lived in urban areas and 39,686 (25.2%) in rural areas. Between the 1992 and 2002 censuses, the population grew by 5% (7,554 persons).

References

Provinces of Biobío Region
Provinces of Chile